Night Beat or Nightbeat may refer to:

 Night Beat (1931 film), a film directed by George B. Seitz
 Night Beat (1947 film), a film directed by Harold Huth
 Night Beat (Sam Cooke album), 1963
 Night Beat (Hank Crawford album), 1989
 Night Beats, an American psychedelic/garage rock band
 Night Beat (U.S. radio program)
 Nightbeat (Transformers) a Transformers character